Little Barrie is an English rock group consisting of Barrie Cadogan (vocals, guitar) and Lewis Wharton (bass, vocals). Virgil Howe contributed drums and vocals from 2007 until his death in 2017. Their sound has drawn from a mixture of influences including freakbeat, garage rock, UK R&B, neo-psychedelia, surf rock, krautrock, funk and rock and roll. The band released Death Express in 2017.

Band history

The first Little Barrie single "Shrug Off Love" / "Reply Me (It Don't Deny Me)" was released in summer 2000. It originated from a demo recorded in 1999 by Cadogan with friends Chris Lee on drums and Miles Newbold engineering the sessions and also playing organ. Shortly after Cadogan met drummer Wayne Fullwood and they began writing together as a duo. The pair played a handful of gigs before relocating to London in September 2000 where they met bassist Lewis Wharton. The trio began playing around London clubs in late 2000 and cut two further singles, "Don't Call It The Truth" / "Give Me A Microphone" in 2001 and "Memories Well" / "Didn't Mean A Thing" in 2002. The early sound of the band was influenced by the rhythms of early soul, funk and R&B.

After sessions in London with producer Edwyn Collins the band released their debut album, We Are Little Barrie in 2005. Following the album's release the band toured in Europe, Japan, Australia and the US before returning in late summer 2005 to begin writing their second album Stand Your Ground, produced by Dan the Automator. Wayne Fullwood left the band during the writing period. Billy Skinner joined the band on drums and work continued on the album in the UK with Mike "Prince Fatty" Pelanconi as producer. It was released in 2007. Alongside the bands R&B and funk inspirations Stand Your Ground featured hints of rockabilly.

Following further tours across Europe, Japan and Australia in 2007 the band backed Paul Weller on the title track of his album 22 Dreams. In late 2007 Virgil Howe, son of Yes guitarist Steve Howe, replaced Skinner on drums. The first recordings featuring the new lineup were in March 2008, when alongside Martin Duffy on keys the trio backed French Polynesian artist Mareva Galanter on her album Happy Fiu.

Throughout 2009, the band toured and continued work writing their third album, King of the Waves. King of the Waves was released in Japan in December 2010 and in the UK and US in summer 2011. The album is harder edged than previous recordings, leaning more towards surf and garage sounds with a greater use of overdriven guitars, feedback and tougher bass and drums from Wharton and Howe. The album's opening track 'Surf Hell' became popular through its use on the game Rocksmith and several synchs on television. The song 'Money in Paper' featured a backing vocal from Edwyn Collins.

Following the release of King of the Waves they hit the road again in Japan and across Europe. In November 2011, the band opened for rising New York soul singer Charles Bradley and his band The Extroadinaires for two shows in Spain. Little Barrie were the opening band on Charles Bradley's US tour on the east coast in February - March 2012. Two more US tours followed that year, spanning the east and west coasts as well as performing in Texas and the mid west.

During 2012, work began on writing new songs for the band's fourth album Shadow. The band continued tour, including a return to the US for shows in Texas and also opening for Dinosaur Jr and The Jon Spencer Blues Explosion before supporting The Stone Roses at La Cigalle in Paris in June. The group then performed in Vietnam and Japan before returning to rehearse tracks for the new album to be recorded that summer.

Whilst capturing the band's live energy, Shadow has a much darker feel than King of the Waves, with more reverb and fuzz effects and influences of psychedelia, freakbeat and krautrock. Track 2 'Fuzzbomb' features Shawn Lee on backing vocals. The band also recorded a version of the song 'Only You' written by Danny Kirwan during his time with Fleetwood Mac. A limited edition 7" single of 'Fuzzbomb'/'Only You' was released as part of Record Store Day 2014. Shadow was released on 26 May 2014 and was followed by tours in the UK, Europe, Japan and the United States.

In January 2015 the band wrote and performed the main title theme music to the Breaking Bad spin-off Better Call Saul. The full length version of the song was opening track on the album Better Call Saul - Original Television Soundtrack: Season 1, released in November 2015. Season two of the series also featured "Why Don't You Do It" from "Stand Your Ground".

On 12 September 2017 Virgil Howe's unexpected death was announced by Yes, of which Virgil Howe's father Steve is a member.

Other projects and associated acts
As well as performing with Morrissey in 2004 and Primal Scream from 2006-present, Barrie Cadogan has also played live with Edwyn Collins, Johnny Marr, Paul Weller, Pete Molinari, Damo Suzuki and Yeti Lane, BP Fallon and Saint Etienne. He has also performed on studio sessions with Primal Scream, Edwyn Collins, Anton Newcombe, Paul Weller, Spiritualized, Scott Asheton, Pete Molinari, Andrew Weatherall, Zook, The Chemical Brothers, Aspects, The Greg Foat Group, Bent, Paul Butler of The Bees, Patti Palladin, Brendan Lynch and The Proclaimers. In 2014 Cadogan also worked as a producer with artist Gil De Ray. Prior to the formation of Little Barrie, he played in Nottingham instrumental outfit Polska with Paul Isherwood, Adam Cann and Dorian Conway who later formed The Soundcarriers. In May 2018, Barrie Cadogan was revealed as the guitarist for the 2018 comeback tour by The The.

Virgil Howe was the son of guitarist Steve Howe and worked on a number of projects with him.   Nexus, by Virgil and Steve Howe was released on 17 November 2017.

Discography

Albums

Singles and EPs

References

External links
Official website

Musical groups established in 2000
English indie rock groups
Musical groups from Nottingham